This is a list of United States post office murals, produced in the United States from 1934 to 1943 through commissions from the Procurement Division of the United States Department of the Treasury. The principal objective of the United States post office murals was to secure artwork that met high artistic standards for public buildings, where it was accessible to all people. The murals were intended to boost the morale of the American people suffering from the effects of the Depression by depicting uplifting subjects the people knew and loved.
Murals produced through the Treasury Department's Section of Painting and Sculpture (1934–1943) were funded as a part of the cost of the construction of new post offices, with 1% of the cost set aside for artistic enhancements. Murals were commissioned through competitions open to all artists in the United States. Almost 850 artists were commissioned to paint 1371 murals, most of which were installed in post offices; 162 of the artists were women and three were African American. The Treasury Relief Art Project (1935–1938), which provided artistic decoration for existing Federal buildings, produced a smaller number of post office murals. TRAP was established with funds from the Works Progress Administration. The Section supervised the creative output of TRAP, and selected a master artist for each project. Assistants were then chosen by the artist from the rolls of the WPA Federal Art Project.

Artists were asked to paint in an "American scene" style, depicting ordinary citizens in a realistic manner. Abstract and modern art styles were discouraged. Artists were also encouraged to produce works that would be appropriate to the communities where they were to be located and to avoid controversial subjects. Projects were closely scrutinized by the Section for style and content, and artists were paid only after each stage in the creative process was approved.

The Section and the Treasury Relief Art Project were overseen by Edward Bruce, who had directed the Public Works of Art Project (1933–1934). They were commission-driven public work programs that employed artists to beautify American government buildings, strictly on the basis of quality. This contrasts with the work-relief mission of the Federal Art Project (1935–1943) of the Works Progress Administration, the largest of the New Deal art projects. So great was its scope and cultural impact that the term "WPA" is often mistakenly used to describe all New Deal art, including the U.S. post office murals. "New Deal artwork" is a more accurate term to describe the works of art created under the federal art programs of that period.

The murals are the subject of efforts by the United States Postal Service to preserve and protect them.  This is particularly important and problematical as some of them have disappeared or deteriorated. Some are ensconced in buildings that are worth far less than the artwork.

Alabama

Alaska

Arizona

Arkansas

California

Colorado

A review of murals in Colorado's post offices found there were no frescos, but rather all had been painted on canvas.

Connecticut

Delaware

District of Columbia

Florida

Georgia

Hawaii

Idaho

Illinois

Indiana

Iowa

Kansas

A number of Kansas post offices were listed on the National Register on basis of their murals, as part of a study of "Kansas Post Offices with Artwork, 1936-1942".

Kentucky

Louisiana

Maine

Maryland

Massachusetts

Michigan

{|class="wikitable sortable"
|-
! Location
! Mural title
! Image
! Artist
! Date
! Notes
!NRHPlisted
|-
|Alma
|Harvest
| 
| Joseph H. Cox
| 1940
| oil on canvas
|
|-
|Belding
|Belding Brothers and Their Silk Industry
|
|Marvin Beerbohm
|1943
|
|
|-
|Birmingham
|The Pioneering Society's Picnic
|
|Carlos Lopez
| 1942
|Building now houses private officeswith mural still on display.
|
|-
|Blissfield
|Laying the Erie and Kalamazoo Railroad
|
|Jean Paul Slusser
|1938
|
|
|-
|Bronson
|Harvest
|
|Arthur Getz
|1941
|
|
|-
|Buchanan
|Production
| 
|Gertrude Goodrich
|1941
|Mural was painted over but is being restored
|
|-
|Calumet
|Copper Mining in Calumet
|
|Joe Lasker
|1941
|
|
|-
|Caro
|Mail on the Farm
|
|David Fredenthal
| 1941
|
|
|-
|Chelsea
|The Way of Life
| 
|George Fisher
|1938
|Moved to new post office building in August 2009
|
|-
|Clare
|The Mail Arrives in Clare
|
|Allan Thomas
|1937
|oil on canvas
|
|-
|Crystal Falls
|Extending the Frontier in Northwest Territory
|
|Allan Thomas
|1938
|oil on canvas
|
|-
|Dearborn
|Ten Eyck’s Tavern on Chicago Road
|
|Rainey Bennett
|1938
|oil on canvasOn display at the Henry Ford Community College Library
|
|-
|Detroit
|Automobile Industry
|
|William Gropper
|1941
|oil on fiberboardOn permanent display in the student center at Wayne State University
|
|-
|East Lansing
|America's First Agricultural College
|
|Henry Bernstein
| 1938
|On permanent loan and display at Michigan State University's Main Library
|
|-
|Eastpointe
|Early Settlers
|
|Frank Cassara
| 1940
|
|
|-
|Eaton Rapids
|Industry and Agriculture
|
|Boris Mestchersky
|1938
|oil on canvas
|
|-
|Frankfort
|On Board the Ferry Car (Ann Arbor #4, Feb. 14, 1923)
|
|Henry Bernstein
|1941
|
| 1989
|-
|Grand Ledge
|Waiting for the Mail
|
|James Calder
|1939
| Winner of the 48-State Mural Competition
|
|-
|Grayling
|The Lumber Camp
|
|Robert Lepper
|1939
|oil on canvasDepicts a typical historical lumber camp populated by lumberjacks, sawing through timber; stacks of logs, logging equipment, workhorses, locomotive; Native American's observing the process
|
|-
|Greenville
|Lumbering
|
|Charles W. Thwaite
|1940
|oil on canvas
|
|-
|Hamtramck
|Products of Industry and Agriculture
|
|Schomer Lichtner
|1940
|oil on canvas
|
|-
|Hamtramck
|Farm Family
|
|Schomer Lichtner
|1940
|oil on canvas
|
|-
|Hamtramck
|City Workers
|
|Schomer Lichtner
|1940
|oil on canvas
|
|-
|Howell
|Rural Delivery
|
|Jaroslaw Brozik
|1941
|oil on canvas
|
|-
|Iron Mountain
|Historic Treatment of Mail Transportation in the West
|
|Vladimir Rouseff
|1935
|5 oil on canvas panels
|
|-
|Iron River
|Paul Bunyan Straightening Out the Round River'''
|
|Milton Horn
|July 16, 1941
|wood carved relief
|
|-
|Marquette
|Marquette Exploring Shores of Lake Superior|
|Dewey Albinson
|1938
|On display at the Marquette US Post Office and Federal Courthouse
|
|-
|Midland
|Fabricating Steel|
|Henry Bernstein
| 1942
|Relocated to the Midland County Services Building in 1989
|
|-
|Paw Paw
|Bounty|
|Carlos Lopez 
|1940
|
|
|-
|Plymouth
|Plymouth Trail|
|Carlos Lopez 
|1938
|
||
|-
|Rockford
|Among the Furrows|
|Pierre Bourdelle
|1940
|
|
|-
|Rogers City
|Harbor at Rogers City|
|James Calder
|1941
|oil on canvas
|
|-
|St. Clair
|St. Clair River|
|James Calder
|1938
|
|
|-
| Wayne
| Landscape Near Wayne – 1875|
| Algot Stenbery
| 1939
| Mural is missing
||
|}

Minnesota

Mississippi

Missouri

Montana

Nebraska

Nevada

New Hampshire

New Jersey

New Mexico

New York

North Carolina

North Dakota

Ohio

Oklahoma

A number of Oklahoma post offices were listed on the National Register as part of the "	Oklahoma Post Offices with Section Art Multiple Property Submission", including those in Coalgate, Hollis, Madill, Nowata, and Watonga.

Oregon

Pennsylvania

Puerto Rico

Rhode Island

South Carolina

South Dakota

Tennessee

Texas

Utah

Vermont

Virgin Islands

Virginia

Washington

West Virginia

Wisconsin

Wyoming

See also
 Section of Painting and Sculpture
 Treasury Relief Art Project
 United States post office murals
 List of Federal Art Project artists
 List of New Deal murals
 List of post offices in the United States
 List of New Deal sculpture

References

Further reading
 Marling, Karal A. Wall-to-wall America: A Cultural History of Post-Office Murals in the Great Depression. Minneapolis: University of Minnesota Press, 1982.
 Mecklenburg, Virginia M. The Public As Patron: A History of the Treasury Department Mural Program. College Park: University of Maryland, Dept. of Art, 1979.
 Puschendorf, L. R. Nebraska's Post Office Murals: Born of the Depression, Fostered by the New Deal. Lincoln, NE: Nebraska State Historical Society, 2012.
 Stevens, Robert L. and Jared A. Fogel. "Conflict and Consensus: New Deal Mural Post Office Art", National Social Science Journal'', vol. 33, no. 2, 160–165.

External links 
 WPAMurals.com 
 New Deal Art Registry
 List of books on post office murals at the National New Deal Preservation Association

Murals in the United States
Public Works of Art Project
Section of Painting and Sculpture
Treasury Relief Art Project
Postal history of the United States